This is a chronological list of mayors of Sofia, the capital of Bulgaria, since that post was established after the Liberation of Bulgaria in 1878. The first governor of Sofia was Petr Alabin.

Initially, the mayors of Sofia were assigned by the Provisional Russian Administration. After the newly restored Bulgarian state was already functioning on its own, in the end of 1878, mayors were chosen by the municipal council. Until 1944, the mayor (with the official title of "Chairman of the City Administrative Council") was appointed through a Tsar's decree after a candidate was suggested by the Minister of Internal Affairs. After that date, the mayor (officially "Chairman of the Executive Committee of the Sofia City (later Capital) People's Council") was formally chosen by the municipal councilors, albeit after being specified by the Bulgarian Communist Party management.

Since the democratic changes and the 7th Grand National Assembly in 1990 that led to the appointment of an interim mayor (Green Party of Bulgaria leader Aleksandar Karakachanov), the residents of Sofia received the right to choose their mayor, the first democratically elected one being Aleksandar Yanchulev on 13 October 1991.

List

References

See also
 List of mayors of Plovdiv
 List of mayors of Varna
 List of mayors of Pleven
List of mayors of Veliko Tarnovo

 
Sofia
Mayors